No. 12 Squadron ( or LLv.12, from 3 May 1942 Le.Lv.12), renamed No. 12 Reconnaissance Squadron (Finnish: Tiedustelulentolaivue 12 or TLe.Lv.12 on 14 February 1944) was a reconnaissance squadron of the Finnish Air Force during World War II. The squadron was part of Flying Regiment 1.

Organization

Winter War
1st Flight (1. Lentue)
2nd Flight (2. Lentue)
3rd Flight (3. Lentue)
Separate Detachment Salo (Erillisosasto Salo)
3rd Flight of No. 14 Squadron (3./LLv. 14, temporary detached in December 1939)

The equipment consisted of 13 Fokker C.Xs, 6 Gloster Gladiators, and 1 Westland Lysander.

Continuation War
1st Flight (1. Lentue) the unofficial flight emblem "Chief Devil Himself" was carried by the Curtiss Hawk 75A aircraft of 1./LLv.12 in 1941. The "Ramming Ram" unit emblem was carried by the aircraft of 1./Le.Lv.12 between 1942 and 1943
2nd Flight (2. Lentue) the unofficial flight emblem "Merry Donkey" was carried by the aircraft of 2./Le.Lv.12 between 1942 and 1943
3rd Flight (3. Lentue) 

The equipment consisted of 6 Fokker C.Xs, 3 Gloster Gladiators, 4 Curtiss Hawk 75As, 12 Fokker D.XXIs, and 4 Blackburn Ripon IIs. By the end of the war the unit also received 20 VL Myrsky IIs, 2 Bristol Blenheim Mk.Is, and 2 Polikarpov U-2s.

Bibliography

External links
Lentolaivue 12

12